Loče may refer to the following settlements in Slovenia:
Loče, Brežice
Loče, Celje
Loče, Slovenske Konjice